This is a list of schools in Tsuen Wan District, Hong Kong.

Secondary schools

 Government
 Tsuen Wan Government Secondary School

 Aided
 AD&FD POHL Leung Sing Tak College (博愛醫院歷屆總理聯誼會梁省德中學)
 Ho Fung College (sponsored by Sik Sik Yuen) (可風中學（嗇色園主辦）)
 Ho Koon Nature Education cum Astronomical Centre (可觀自然教育中心暨天文館)
 Liu Po Shan Memorial College (廖寶珊紀念書院)
 Lui Ming Choi Lutheran College (路德會呂明才中學)
 PLK Lee Shing Pik College (保良局李城璧中學)
 PLK Yao Ling Sun College (保良局姚連生中學)
 Po On Commercial Association Siu Ching Secondary School (寶安商會王少清中學)
 SKH Li Ping Secondary School (聖公會李炳中學)
 St Francis Xavier's School, Tsuen Wan (荃灣聖芳濟中學)
 Textile Institute American Chamber of Commerce Woo Hon Fai Secondary School (紡織學會美國商會胡漢輝中學)
 Tsuen Wan Public Ho Chuen Yiu Memorial College (荃灣公立何傳耀紀念中學)
 YCH Lim Por Yen Secondary School (仁濟醫院林百欣中學)

 Private
 Sear Rogers International School

Primary schools

 Government
 Hoi Pa Street Government Primary School (海壩街官立小學)
 Tsuen Wan Government Primary School (荃灣官立小學)

 Aided
 CCC Chuen Yuen First Primary School (中華基督教會全完第一小學)
 CCC Kei Wai Primary School (中華基督教會基慧小學)
 CCC Kei Wai Primary School (Ma Wan) (中華基督教會基慧小學（馬灣）)
 Chai Wan Kok Catholic Primary School (柴灣角天主教小學)
 Emmanuel Primary School (靈光小學)
 HKTA Yuen Yuen Institute Shek Wai Kok Primary School (香港道教聯合會圓玄學院石圍角小學)
 Ho Shun Primary School (sponsored by Sik Sik Yuen) (嗇色園主辦可信學校)
 Holy Cross Lutheran School (路德會聖十架學校)
 Hong Kong Baptist Convention Primary School (香港浸信會聯會小學)
 Kwai-Ming Wu Memorial School of Precious Blood (寶血會伍季明紀念學校)
 Lei Muk Shue Catholic Primary School (梨木樹天主教小學)
 Mary of Providence Primary School (天佑小學)
 Shak Chung Shan Memorial Catholic Primary School (天主教石鐘山紀念小學)
 Sham Tseng Catholic Primary School (深井天主教小學)
 Si Yuan School of the Precious Blood (寶血會思源學校)
 SKH Chu Oi Primary School (Lei Muk Shue) (聖公會主愛小學（梨木樹）)
 Tsuen Wan Catholic Primary School (荃灣天主教小學)
 Tsuen Wan Chiu Chow Public School (荃灣潮州公學)
 Tsuen Wan Public Ho Chuen Yiu Memorial Primary School (荃灣公立何傳耀紀念小學)

 Private
 Rosebud Primary School (玫瑰蕾小學)

Special schools

 Aided
 Hong Kong Red Cross Hospital Schools Yan Chai Hospital (香港紅十字會醫院學校)

References

Lists of schools in Hong Kong
Tsuen Wan District